Kent R. Weeks (born December 16, 1941) is an American Egyptologist.

Biography
He was born in Everett, Washington, on December 16, 1941.

He remembers deciding to be an Egyptologist at the age of eight. Weeks attended R. A. Long High School in Longview, Washington, and graduated in 1959. He studied anthropology at University of Washington in Seattle, from where he obtained a master's degree. He visited Egypt for the first time in 1963 and was active in digs in Nubia associated with relocation work necessitated by the building of the Aswan Dam and the flooding of the Nile Valley to create Lake Nasser. In 1970 he earned a doctorate in Egyptology from Yale University.

Dr. Weeks' professional career began with his appointment as Professor of Anthropology at American University in Cairo for the academic year 1971–72.  Later he was appointed assistant Curator of Egyptian Art at the Metropolitan Museum of Art, then assistant Professor at the University of Chicago and Director of its Institute in Luxor (Chicago House), then professor at the University of California, Berkeley, and in 1988 he became a professor of Egyptology at The American University in Cairo. His wife, Susan Weeks, was also an archaeologist and a gifted artist before her death in December 2009.

In 1978, Weeks devised and launched the Theban Mapping Project–an exceedingly ambitious plan to photograph and map every temple and tomb in the Theban Necropolis. As part of this project, Weeks introduced hot air ballooning to the Luxor area with the intent of making inexpensive aerial surveys, which grew into an important part of the local tourist industry. However, a more important achievement of the Project was its 1995 discovery of the identity, and vast dimensions, of KV5, the tomb of the sons of Ramesses II in the Valley of the Kings.

In 1996, Weeks received the Golden Plate Award of the American Academy of Achievement.

Publications
Atlas of the Valley of the Kings: The Theban Mapping Project
The Illustrated Guide to Luxor and the Valley of the Kings
The Valley of the Kings: The Tombs and the Funerary of Thebes West, (as editor)
The Lost Tomb, 1998

References

External links
The Theban Mapping Project
Dr. Kent R. Weeks' profile

1941 births
Living people
People from Everett, Washington
American Egyptologists
People from Longview, Washington
University of Washington alumni